The 2013 British Academy Television Awards nominations were announced on 9 April 2013. The award ceremony was held at the Royal Festival Hall in London on 12 May 2013.

Winners and Nominees
Winners are listed first and emboldened.

Leading Actor
 Ben Whishaw – Richard II: "The Hollow Crown" (BBC Two)
 Sean Bean – Accused: "Tracie's Story" (BBC One)
 Derek Jacobi – Last Tango in Halifax (BBC One)
 Toby Jones – The Girl (BBC Two)

Leading Actress
 Sheridan Smith – Mrs Biggs (ITV)
 Rebecca Hall – Parade's End (BBC Two)
 Sienna Miller – The Girl (BBC Two)
 Anne Reid – Last Tango in Halifax (BBC One)

Supporting Actor
 Simon Russell Beale – Henry IV, Parts I & II: "The Hollow Crown" (BBC Two)
 Peter Capaldi – The Hour (BBC Two)
 Stephen Graham – Accused: "Tracie's Story" (BBC One)
 Harry Lloyd – The Fear (Channel 4)

Supporting Actress
 Olivia Colman – Accused: "Mo's Story" (BBC One)
 Anastasia Hille – The Fear (Channel 4)
 Sarah Lancashire – Last Tango in Halifax (BBC One)
 Imelda Staunton – The Girl (BBC Two)

Entertainment Performance
 Alan Carr – Alan Carr: Chatty Man (Channel 4)
 Ant & Dec – I'm a Celebrity...Get Me Out of Here! (ITV)
 Sarah Millican – The Sarah Millican Television Programme (BBC Two)
 Graham Norton – The Graham Norton Show (BBC One)

Female Performance In A Comedy Programme
 Olivia Colman – Twenty Twelve (BBC Two)
 Julia Davis – Hunderby (Sky Atlantic)
 Miranda Hart – Miranda (BBC One)
 Jessica Hynes – Twenty Twelve (BBC Two)

Male Performance In A Comedy Programme
 Steve Coogan – Alan Partridge: Welcome to the Places of My Life (Sky Atlantic)
 Hugh Bonneville – Twenty Twelve (BBC Two)
 Peter Capaldi – The Thick of It (BBC Two)
 Greg Davies – Cuckoo (BBC Three)

Single Drama
 Murder (BBC Two) Everyday (Channel 4)
 The Girl (BBC Two)
 Richard II: "The Hollow Crown" (BBC Two)

Mini-Series
 Room at the Top (BBC Four) Accused (BBC One)
 Mrs Biggs (ITV)
 Parade's End (BBC Two)

Drama Series
 Last Tango in Halifax (BBC One) Ripper Street (BBC One)
 Scott & Bailey (ITV)
 Silk (BBC One)

Soap & Continuing Drama
 EastEnders (BBC One) Coronation Street (ITV)
 Emmerdale (ITV)
 Shameless (Channel 4)

International
 Girls (HBO/Sky Atlantic) The Bridge (SVT1/DR1/BBC Four)
 Game of Thrones (HBO/Sky Atlantic)
 Homeland (Showtime/Channel 4)

Factual Series
 Our War (BBC Three) 24 Hours in A&E (Channel 4)
 Great Ormond Street (BBC Two)
 Make Bradford British (Channel 4)

Huw Wheldon Award for Specialist Factual
 All In The Best Possible Taste with Grayson Perry (Channel 4) The Plane Crash (Channel 4)
 The Plot to Bring Down Britain's Planes (Channel 4)
 The Secret History of Our Streets (BBC Two)

Robert Flaherty Award for Single Documentary
 7/7: One Day in London (BBC Two) Baka: A Cry from the Rainforest (BBC Two)
 Lucian Freud: Painted Life (BBC Two)
 Nina Conti – A Ventriloquist's Story: Her Master's Voice (BBC Four)

Features
 The Great British Bake Off (BBC Two) Bank of Dave (Channel 4)
 Grand Designs (Channel 4)
 Paul O'Grady: For the Love of Dogs (ITV)

Reality and Constructed Factual
 Made in Chelsea (E4) The Audience (Channel 4)
 I'm a Celebrity...Get Me Out of Here! (ITV)
 The Young Apprentice (BBC One)

Current Affairs
 This World: "The Shame of the Catholic Church" (BBC Two) Panorama: "Britain's Hidden Housing Crisis" (BBC One)
 Exposure: "The Other Side of Jimmy Savile" (ITV)
 Al Jazeera Investigates: "What Killed Arafat?" (Al Jazeera English)

News Coverage
 Granada Reports: "Hillsborough – The Truth at Last" (ITV) BBC News at Ten: "Syria" (BBC One)
 Channel 4 News: "Battle for Homs" (Channel 4)

Sport & Live Event
 The London 2012 Paralympic Games (Channel 4) The London 2012 Olympics: "Super Saturday" (BBC One)
 The London 2012 Olympic Opening Ceremony (BBC One)
 Wimbledon 2012: "Men's Final" (BBC One)

Lew Grade Award for Entertainment Programme
 The Graham Norton Show (BBC One) Dynamo: Magician Impossible (Watch)
 Have I Got News for You (BBC One)
 A League of Their Own (Sky1)

Comedy Programme
 The Revolution Will Be Televised (BBC Three) Cardinal Burns (E4)
 Mr Stink (BBC One)
 Alan Partridge: Welcome to the Places of My Life (Sky Atlantic)

Situation Comedy
 Twenty Twelve (BBC Two) Episodes (BBC Two)
 Hunderby (Sky Atlantic)
 The Thick of It (BBC Two)

Radio Times Audience Award
 Game of Thrones (HBO/Sky Atlantic) Call the Midwife (BBC One)
 The Great British Bake Off (BBC Two)
 Homeland (Showtime/Channel 4)
 The London 2012 Olympic Opening Ceremony (BBC One)
 Strictly Come Dancing (BBC One)

Special AwardClare BaldingFellowshipMichael PalinBAFTA TributeDoctor Who

Wins per broadcaster

In Memoriam

Patrick Moore
Kenneth Kendall
John Ammonds
Peter Gilmore
Clive Dunn
Mary Tamm
Larry Hagman
Michael Hurll
Simon Ward
Bill Tarmey
James Grout
Robert Kee
Richard Griffiths
Alastair Burnet
Geoffrey Hughes
Jack Klugman
Frank Thornton
Mike Morris
Nick Milligan
Gerry Anderson
Victor Spinetti
Sid Waddell
Max Bygraves
Denis Forman
Tony Gubba
Eric Sykes
Angharad Rees
Alasdair Milne
Richard Briers

See also
 2013 British Academy Television Craft Awards
 British Academy Television Awards
 BAFTA Scotland
 BAFTA Cymru

References

External links
Official site at BAFTA.org

2013 awards in the United Kingdom
British Academy Television Awards
British Academy Television Awards, 2012
Annual television shows
British Academy Television Awards
British Academy Television Awards
Royal Festival Hall